Kutch is an unincorporated community in Elbert County, in the U.S. state of Colorado.

History
A post office called Kutch was established in 1905, and remained in operation until 1971. The community was named after Ira Kutch, a local rancher.

References

Unincorporated communities in Elbert County, Colorado
Unincorporated communities in Colorado